The Pinacoteca do Estado de São Paulo (Portuguese for "pinacotheca (picture gallery) of the state of São Paulo") is one of the most important art museums in Brazil.

History 
The museum is housed in a 1900 building in Jardim da Luz, Downtown São Paulo, designed by Ramos de Azevedo and Domiziano Rossi to be the headquarters of the Lyceum of Arts and Crafts. It is the oldest art museum in São Paulo, founded on December 24, 1905, and established as a state museum since 1911.

After passing through a renovation conducted by Paulo Mendes da Rocha  in the 1990s, the museum became one of the most dynamic cultural institutions of the country, lining up with the international circuit of exhibitions, hosting cultural events and keeping an active bibliographic production. Pinacoteca also maintains a branch in Bom Retiro district, called Estação Pinacoteca, where it holds temporary exhibitions and the institution's documentation center.

2008 heist 

On June 12, 2008, three armed men broke into the museum with a crowbar and a carjack around 5:09 am and stole The Painter and the Model (1963) and Minotaur, Drinker and Women (1933) by Pablo Picasso, Women at the Window (1926) by Emiliano Di Cavalcanti, and Couple (1919) by Lasar Segall. It was the second theft of art in São Paulo in six months. On August 6, 2008, two paintings were discovered in the house of one of the thieves and recovered by police in the same city.

Collection 
The Pinacoteca has a wide-ranging collection of Brazilian art, mainly noted for its vast assemblage of 19th-century paintings and sculptures, one of the largest in the country, as well as for a number of iconic Brazilian Modernist artworks. The collection also includes a department of works on paper, European paintings and sculptures from 19th-century artists, decorative arts, etc.

Paintings 
(selection)

See also
 Ema Gordon Klabin Cultural Foundation
 Museu Nacional de Belas Artes
 São Paulo Museum of Art

References

External links
 
 
Virtual tour of the Pinacoteca do Estado de São Paulo provided by Google Arts & Culture

Art museums and galleries in Brazil
Museums in São Paulo
Art museums established in 1905
1905 establishments in Brazil
Tourist attractions in São Paulo